Too Much (Little) Love is a 1998 French comedy film directed by Jacques Doillon. It was entered into the 48th Berlin International Film Festival.

Cast
 Lou Doillon as Camille
 Jérémie Lippmann as David
 Elise Perrier as Emma
 Alexia Stresi as Margot
 Lambert Wilson as Paul

References

External links

1998 films
1998 comedy films
French comedy films
1990s French-language films
Films directed by Jacques Doillon
1990s French films